Big Business is a 1930 British musical film directed by Oscar M. Sheridan and starring Frances Day, Barrie Oliver and Virginia Vaughan. It was made at the Twickenham Film Studios in London.

Plot summary

Cast
 Frances Day as Pamela Fenchurch 
 Barrie Oliver as Barnie  
 Virginia Vaughan as Kay  
 Anthony Ireland as Jimmy 
 Ben Welden as Fenchurch 
 Jimmy Godden as Oppenheimer  
 Billy Fry as Augustus  
 Lewis Keezing as Miggs
 Leslie 'Hutch' Hutchinson as Pianist  
 Arthur Roseberry as himself - Orchestra Leader

References

Bibliography
 Low, Rachael. Filmmaking in 1930s Britain. George Allen & Unwin, 1985.
 Wood, Linda. British Films, 1927–1939. British Film Institute, 1986.

External links
 
 

1930 films
British musical films
British black-and-white films
1930 musical films
1930s English-language films
Films shot at Twickenham Film Studios
Fox Film films
Films shot in London
1930s American films
1930s British films